Sir Theophilus Finch, 2nd Baronet (2 October 1573 – ) was an English nobleman and politician.

Early life
Finch was born on 2 October 1573. He was the eldest son of Sir Moyle Finch, 1st Baronet and Elizabeth Finch, suo jure Countess of Winchilsea. Among his younger siblings were Thomas Finch (later 2nd Earl of Winchilsea who married Cicely Wentworth), Sir Heneage Finch (later Speaker of the House of Commons), Francis Finch (a barrister who was MP for Eye), and Lady Catherine Finch (who married Sir John Wentworth, 1st Baronet, of Gosfield).

His maternal grandparents were the former Anne Poyntz (a daughter of Sir Nicholas Poyntz) and Sir Thomas Heneage, who was Chancellor of the Duchy of Lancaster and Vice-Chamberlain of the Household in the latter years of the reign of Elizabeth I.

Career
Finch was matriculated at Magdalen College, Oxford in 1588, earning his B.A. in 1592. He was admitted to Gray's Inn in 1618.

Finch was knighted in 1599. He was returned as a Member of Parliament for Great Yarmouth in 1614.

Personal life
On 16 July 1596, he married Agnes Heydon, only child of Sir Christopher Heydon of Baconsthorpe, and, his third wife, Agnes Crane (a daughter of Robert Crane, of Chilton).

His widow died the following year and was buried in St. Anne's Church, Blackfriars.

References

1573 births
1619 deaths
Theophilus
Theophilus
English MPs 1614
Alumni of Magdalen College, Oxford
People from Great Yarmouth